Levon Mnatsakanyan (Armenian:Լեւոն Մնացականյան; born 14 September 1965) is a politician, and a former Minister of Defence of Artsakh.

Biography
He was born in Stepanakert in 1965 to an Armenian family. Mnatsakanyan began his military service in 1983 when he moved to the Belarusian SSR to work in the Soviet Army's Belarusian Military District. In 1989, he graduated with honors from the Karl Marx Institute of Polytechnic. During the period after the Soviet Union fell apart when Armenia began to build up its military, Mnatsakanyan served in artillery units in the Artsakh Defense Army and the Armed Forces of Armenia. He graduated from the Military Academy of the General Staff of the Armed Forces of Russia in 2005, which resulted in him returning to Artsakh later that year to become the deputy commander of the defense army. 

He was appointed by President Bako Sahakyan in 2015 as defense minister, a position he served in for just over 3 years before he was replaced in December 2018. He was then appointed to the post of Director of the State Service of Emergency Situations. He was dismissed in June 2019 and was made Chief of Artskah Police. He is currently married and has three sons.

He took part in the Second Nagorno-Karabakh War in 2020. Near the end of the war, during the Battle of Shusha, Mnatsakanyan commanded the Armenian troops in nearby Shushakend.

Awards 
 Two Orders of the Combat Cross
 Order of St. Vardan Mamikonyan 
 Medals "For Services to the Fatherland"
 Medal of Marshal Baghramyan
 Medal of Andranik Ozanyan
 Medal of Admiral Isakov

References 

1965 births
Living people
Artsakh military personnel
Military Academy of the General Staff of the Armed Forces of Russia alumni
Defence ministers of the Republic of Artsakh
Armenian military personnel of the 2020 Nagorno-Karabakh war